Chavornay railway station is a railway station in the municipality of Chavornay, in the Swiss canton of Vaud. It is located at the junction of the standard gauge Jura Foot line of Swiss Federal Railways and Orbe–Chavornay line of Travys.

Services 
 the following services stop at Chavornay:

References

External links 
 
 

Railway stations in the canton of Vaud
Swiss Federal Railways stations